Kennedy Valentine Burke (born February 14, 1997) is an American professional basketball player. She was drafted by the Dallas Wings in the 2019 WNBA Draft, and has played for the Indiana Fever, Seattle Storm, and the Washington Mystics in the WNBA.

Burke completed her college career with the UCLA Bruins of the University of California, Los Angeles in 2019. Burke is from Northridge, Los Angeles and played for Sierra Canyon School in nearby Chatsworth.

Family
Burke has an older sister, Kody Burke, who played college basketball at NC State. Her father, Rogelio Burke, is from Panama and played basketball professionally in Panama and Mexico.

UCLA statistics

Source

WNBA career statistics

Regular season

|-
| align="left" | 2019
| align="left" | Indiana
| 31 || 7 || 13.6 || .385 || .350 || .705 || 1.5 || 0.7 || 0.6 || 0.3 || 0.7 || 4.4 
|-
| align="left" | 2020
| align="left" | Indiana
| 22 || 11 || 18.3 || .449 || .313 || .714 || 1.8 || 1.1 || 0.6 || 0.4 || 1.2 || 7.2
|-
| align="left" | 2021
| align="left" | Seattle
| 23 || 0 || 7.7 || .446 || .333 || .625 || 0.8 || 0.3 || 0.3 || 0.1 || 0.5 || 2.9
|-
| align="left" | 2022
| align="left" | Washington
| 16 || 4 || 13.9 || .446 || .344 || .588 || 2.2 || 0.4 || 1.0 || 0.3 || 0.5 || 5.4
|-
| align="left" | Career
| align="left" | 4 years, 3 teams
| 92 || 22 || 13.3 || .428 || .333 || .681 || 1.5 || 0.7 || 0.6 || 0.3 || 0.7 || 4.9

Postseason

|-
| align="left" | 2021
| align="left" | Seattle
| 1 || 0 || 5.0 || .000 || .000 || .000 || 3.0 || 0.0 || 0.0 || 0.0 || 1.0 || 0.0
|-
| align="left" | Career
| align="left" | 1 year, 1 team
| 1 || 0 || 5.0 || .000 || .000 || .000 || 3.0 || 0.0 || 0.0 || 0.0 || 1.0 || 0.0

References

External links
UCLA Bruins bio

1997 births
Living people
American people of Panamanian descent
American women's basketball players
Basketball players from California
Dallas Wings draft picks
Guards (basketball)
Indiana Fever players
People from Northridge, Los Angeles
Seattle Storm players
Sierra Canyon School alumni
UCLA Bruins women's basketball players
Washington Mystics players